Ruth Patricia White (April 24, 1914December 3, 1969) was an American actress who worked in theatre, film, and television. She won Emmy and Obie awards, and was a Tony Award nominee.

Early years
A lifelong resident of Perth Amboy, New Jersey, White was of Irish Catholic descent. She attended St. Mary's High School and graduated with a bachelor's degree in literature from New Jersey College for Women, now Douglass Residential College, Rutgers University in 1935. While pursuing her acting career in nearby New York City, she taught acting and drama at Seton Hall University. During this period, she also studied acting with Maria Ouspenskaya.

Early career 
White began her acting career in 1940 as an apprentice at the Cape May Playhouse. Late in World War II, she spent six months in Alaska and the Aleutians touring with a USO troupe. For five years, beginning in 1948, she was the leading resident actress at Bucks County Playhouse.

White's Broadway debut came in The Ivy Green (1949).

Career hiatus and resurgence

White's career was delayed in the late 1950s while she nursed her ailing mother. She appeared in off-Broadway plays of Samuel Beckett ("Happy Days") and Edward Albee ("Malcolm" and "Box"). She earned a Tony Award nomination in 1968 for her role in Harold Pinter's The Birthday Party.

By the end of the 1960s, she had become one of New York's most highly praised and in demand character actresses, and appeared in Midnight Cowboy, Hang 'Em High and No Way To Treat A Lady.

White's final film role was in The Pursuit of Happiness, released 14 months after her death.

Recognition
In 1962, White won an Obie Award for Distinguished Performance by an Actress for her work in the play Happy Days. 

In 1964, she won an Emmy Award for her role in the Hallmark Hall of Fame TV Movie Little Moon of Alban.

Death
White, who never married, died of cancer on December 3, 1969, aged 55. She was survived by her brothers, Richard and Charles, and her sister, Mrs. Genevieve Driscoll. She was predeceased by another sister, 
Mary Cecile White, who served as president of the Perth Amboy Teachers Union Local 857. She is interred with her brothers Charles and Richard in the family plot at Saint Mary's Cemetery, Perth Amboy, New Jersey.

Filmography

References

External links
 
 
 

1914 births
1969 deaths
Actresses from New Jersey
American television actresses
American film actresses
Outstanding Performance by a Supporting Actress in a Drama Series Primetime Emmy Award winners
People from Perth Amboy, New Jersey
Deaths from cancer in New Jersey
20th-century American actresses